Aksenovo is a rural locality (a selo) and the administrative center of Aksyonovsky Selsoviet, Alsheyevsky District, Bashkortostan, Russia. The population was 1,047 as of 2010. There are 15 streets.

Geography 
Aksenovo is located 35 km southwest of Rayevsky (the district's administrative centre) by road. Kim is the nearest rural locality.

References 

Rural localities in Alsheyevsky District